

Gene 

Fam188a is a protein found in humans. It is also known as Derp5 (Dermal Papilla Derived Protein 5,) c10orf97,  or brain my042 protein. It is encoded by the Derp5 gene located on chromosome 10p13. Fam188a and its paralogs in other species are all members of the DUF4205 superfamily of protein domains. Fam188a is a highly conserved gene found in all vertebrates. Fam188a is a gene expressed throughout the body.

Homology 

All mammalian species compared share a 95-99% homology similarity to Homo sapiens Fam188a. The reasons behind this are unknown, but it can be inferred that Fam188a must play an important role in proper cellular function in mammals, as even small changes over time in important genes can drastically alter their function.

Avians, Fish, and Insects also shared a similarity in the 30-40% range with Homo sapiens' Fam188a. Even though there are several hundred million years of divergence from Humans and insects, the fact that there is still a 40% similarity in insects seems to suggest that this gene hasn't changed extremely over such long timespans, and must have been important for other species as well long ago. The splice patterns in these other species aren't known, but in humans there are at least 19 different isoforms but with only 1 major paralog: Fam188b. This paralog differs structurally in 3 exons with Fam188a.

Protein 

Fam188a is a 445-Amino Acid chain. Structurally, it doesn't show many interesting regions that could easily set it apart from other proteins. Fam188a has no transmembrane domains, it has no sequence repeats.

Function and interacting proteins 

The I-TASSER protein folding results show that Fam188a's protein product has a similar structure to 1CFF, a Calmodulin binding peptide. Calmodulin is involved in cell apoptosis as well, so this can shed light on the theorized function of Fam188a as well.

The protein fold is most functionally similar to 3LEW, a “SusD-like carbohydrate binding protein from Bacteroides vulgatus” (Joint Center for Structural Genomics). 3LEW shares a 90% similarity with Fam188a, and although not enough to make a concrete connection, it is enough to establish a base idea of related structures. Another protein that is functionally similar (81%) is 3SNX, a “putative SusD-like carbohydrate binding protein from Bacteroides thetaiotaomicron VPI-5482”. The function of Fam188a can be assumed to play a role in cell apoptosis, and that is because it shares structural similarities with other proteins that are involved in this process. Although there is no CARD-domain as would normally be found in an apoptotic peptide, fam188a does share a similar function with 1cffA, a “calmodulin binding peptide of the Ca2+ pump”. Since Calmodulin is known to cause apoptosis throughout various body tissues via the Ca2+ pump and 1cffA shares a 26% similarity with Fam188a, I can hypothesize that apoptosis truly is the function of Fam188a. Other molecules similar to Fam188a are 1linA, and 1qx7M, which share 23% and 18% structure similarity respectively, and both of these molecules deal with either the Ca2+ pump or Calmodulin expression as well.

References